The Menlo Oaks are the athletic teams that represent Menlo College, located in Atherton, California, in intercollegiate sports as a member of the National Association of Intercollegiate Athletics (NAIA), primarily competing in the Golden State Athletic Conference (GSAC) for most of its sports since the 2015–16 academic year; while its men's & women's wrestling teams compete in the Cascade Collegiate Conference (CCC). The Oaks previously competed in the California Pacific Conference (CalPac) from 1996–97 to 2014–15.

The college provides competitive activities for men and women enrolled at the college.

Varsity teams
Menlo competes in 23 intercollegiate varsity sports: Men's varsity sports include baseball, basketball, cross country, golf, soccer, tennis, distance track, volleyball and wrestling; while women's varsity sports include basketball, cross country, golf, soccer, softball, tennis, distance track, volleyball and wrestling; and co-ed sports include competitive cheer, competitive dance, eSports, rowing, and weightlifting.

Football
Originally a junior college program, the Menlo Oaks football team played at the four-year level from 1986 to 2014. On February 1, 2015, the Menlo Board of Trustees voted to end the college's football program and cited financial viability issues as a major reason.

Three Menlo football players have played in the NFL: Burt Delavan, Nate Jackson, and Kaulana Park.

From 2006 to 2010, Menlo played in the Northwest Conference (NWC), an NCAA Division III athletic conference. From 2011 to 2014, Menlo was an NAIA independent school.

References

External links